The 2007 Friends Provident Trophy was an English county cricket tournament, held between 22 April and 19 August 2007. The tournament was won by Durham.

Changes from previous tournament 
Following the 2006 Cheltenham & Gloucester Trophy, which had been won by Sussex, various changes were made to the tournament. The first of these to be announced was the inclusion of a semi-final stage in 2007, following complaints of there being "too many meaningless matches". Another change was that of the competition sponsor; Cheltenham & Gloucester, who were reportedly unhappy at the format for 2006, cancelled their future sponsorship before the 2006 season began. Friends Provident were revealed as the new sponsors on 8 February 2007.

The final major change from 2006 was the introduction of player referrals. Introduced on a trial basis, the fielding captain or batsman involved had the right to refer decisions to the third umpire if they disagreed with the decision of the on-field umpires. Each team were permitted two appeals per innings, losing an appeal should the third umpire concur with his on-field colleague. However, this option was only available during televised matches, which led some to suggest it would favour some teams over others.

Format 
The eighteen first-class counties were joined by the Scottish and Irish national teams and divided into two groups, north and south. Each team played each other once, with the top two teams from each group progressing to the semi-final stage. During the group stage, teams were awarded two points for a win, one point for a tie, abandonment or a no result, with no points awarded for a defeat. Teams level on points at the end of the group stage were separated by most wins, followed by net run rate, followed by most wickets taken per balls bowled in matches achieving a result.

Group stage

North Conference

South Conference

Knockout stage

Semi finals 

Durham came out the victors in a low-scoring encounter where both sides collapsed to 38–7. Heavy rain had fallen over the course of the previous few days and overnight, creating a damp pitch offering "enough movement for the ball to find the edge or earn lbws". Andy Bichel was the only batsman to make a significant score (24 runs from 35 balls faced), as Neil Killeen and Ottis Gibson took three wickets each before Liam Plunkett claimed career-best bowling figures of 4 for 15.

Chasing a small target, Durham also lost early wickets, as Bichel and the on-loan Martin Saggers, followed by Graham Napier, reduced them to 38–7. This brought Plunkett to the crease, and, batting "sensibly rather than desperately", he hit 30 of the remaining 34 runs to win the match.

Warwickshire elected not to include Ian Bell in their line-up, opting instead not to disrupt the side that had got to the semi-final. Hampshire, however, did select Kevin Pietersen, who was flown to Southampton on a chartered helicopter following England's Test match win over the West Indies.

Hampshire won the toss and chose to bat first, but started slowly, with John Crawley playing an anchor role following the early wickets of Michael Carberry and Michael Lumb. He was the key batsman on what was described as a "sluggish" pitch, and scored 64 before being narrowly run out by Heath Streak's throw from third man. In reply, Warwickshire seemed on course for victory at 98–3, before Sean Ervine dismissed top-scorer Kumar Sangakkara and Alex Loudon in the same over. Despite a battling innings from Tim Ambrose, Warwickshire never recovered, bowled out for 166.

Final 

Durham's preparations for the final were hampered by the news that Steve Harmison would be unable to play after sustaining a muscle tear in his back in a County Championship match against Surrey. Hampshire were without Stuart Clark, whose two month contract had expired; Daren Powell was his replacement.

Durham batted first and scored 312–5, with Shivnarine Chanderpaul top-scoring with 78 before being run out by a "magnificent throw from long-on" by Michael Carberry. Hampshire's bowling was poor, with their six-man bowling attack of Powell, Jamie Bruce, Dimitri Mascarenhas, Sean Ervine, Chris Tremlett and Shane Warne "struggling [sic] for consistency". Phil Mustard and Kyle Coetzer joined Chanderpaul in scoring half-centuries for Durham, in what was the highest 50-overs total in domestic Lord's finals.

Hampshire's reply started badly; with the opening two deliveries of the innings, Ottis Gibson "slanted successive balls across Lumb and Ervine" to get both left-handers to edge to Michael Di Venuto at second slip. Hampshire's chase was "in tatters" when Kevin Pietersen was dismissed, and once John Crawley's 68 was ended by Paul Collingwood, Durham had effectively won. Rain stopped play with Hampshire on 158–5, ensuring the two sides would have to return the following day to complete the match. Upon resuming, Durham required less than nine overs to take the final five wickets.

Durham's win brought their first domestic trophy since becoming a first-class county in 1992, and left Glamorgan and Leicestershire as the only counties to have never won the tournament in one of its various guises.

Notes

References 

 Berry, Scyld (ed.) (2008): Wisden Cricketers' Almanack, 145th edition, John Wisden & Co. Ltd. .

External links 
 

Friends Provident Trophy seasons
Friends Provident Trophy, 2007